The New Zealand ten-cent coin is the lowest-denomination coin of the New Zealand dollar. The 10-cent coin was introduced when the New Zealand dollar was introduced on 10 July 1967, replacing the New Zealand shilling coin. In 2006 its size was reduced as part of a revision of New Zealand's coins, which also saw its alloy become copper-plated steel.

Design

1967 to 2006 
On 10 July 1967, New Zealand decimalised its currency, replacing the pound with the dollar at a rate of one pound to two dollars and one shilling to ten cents. The 10-cent coin was introduced to directly replace the one-shilling coin.

The coin was made of cupronickel, 23.62 mm in diameter, and weighed 5.66 grams.  It included the words "one shilling" for the years 1967, 1968 and 1969; this was dropped in 1970.

2006 onwards 

On 31 July 2006, the new 10-cent coin was released alongside the new 20-cent and 50-cent coins as part of the Reserve Bank's "Change for the better" silver coin replacement. The new 10-cent coin had the same reverse as the 1967 to 2006 minted coins and the same obverse as the 1999-onward coins, but the coins were reduced in size. The new 10-cent coins are made of steel, plated with copper. The new coins are 20.5 mm in diameter and 3.30 grams in weight. They have unmilled edges. It also appears that the new coin has taken on a possible new feature located between the tongue of the tiki: two small letters, J on the left side and B on the right, engraved into the coin. 

The old 10-cent coins were demonetised on 1 November 2006. A total of 260,210,000 old 10 cent coins were issued, a total value of $26,021,000.00

From 2006 to 2019, 340,500,000 new 10 cent coins have been issued, a total value of $34,050,000.00

Future 
After the death of Queen Elizabeth II in September 2022, the Reserve Bank said it would exhaust its existing coin stocks before introducing new coins featuring King Charles III. Based on current stock levels, this would likely be several years away.

See also 
 Coins of the New Zealand dollar

References

10
Ten-cent coins
1967 establishments in New Zealand